The Brazilian Navy has a large number of active and planned projects, under the modernization plans of the Brazilian Armed Forces, defined in the National Defense White Paper (Portuguese: Livro Branco da Defesa Nacional - LBDN). From 2010, Brazil started a radical change in its military policy, aiming to consolidate itself as the major power of Latin America, then the country's military strategists saw the great importance in modernize the Navy, both in terms of global projection and deterrence against possible threats to national interests by foreign powers from the year 2040, the total estimated budget for the plan was estimated in US$ 119 billion in 2010.

The prospective scenario analysis developed in 2005 by the U.S. Pentagon for the year 2035, foresees a permanent growth of Brazil's influence in international relations. The intensification of projection in the concert of nations and its greater insertion in the global decisions, conduct the Armed Forces to a new structure compatible with the country's new political-strategic status. In 2020, was approved by the MoD the increase of the defense budget from 1.4% to 2% of the GDP.

Active projects

Nuclear submarines
From 2018 under the PROSUB program (initials in Portuguese to Submarine Development Program), Brazil started the construction of the first national nuclear submarine of the Álvaro Alberto-class SSNs, the estimated costs related to development and construction surpassed the US$ 7.4 billion in 2020. The country plans six units of the class by the 2040s.

Conventional submarines

In 2009, under the PROSUB, Brazil signed cooperation agreements with France, for the joint-development and construction of four Scorpène-class SSKs, in a deal of US$ 10 billion, with construction of the four boats in Brazil and total transfer of technology agreement. The country has launched two of the boats as of 2021, the Riachuelo in 2018, and the Humaitá in 2020. The other two, Tonelero and Angostura will be launched in 2021 and 2022 respectively.

Frigates
Under the PROSUPER program (initials in Portuguese to Surface Means Obtainment Program), Brazil signed in 2020 a € 2 billion contract with Germany's ThyssenKrupp Marine Systems, for the joint-development and construction of four Tamandaré-class general purpose frigates. Same as Scorpenes agreements, this contract define the construction of the four boats in Brazil and also total transfer of technology from Germany. In the same year, was reported that the Brazilian Navy plans to order two more class frigates until 2024–25, extending the total to six boats.

Ocean patrol vessels
The country is conducting the construction of two Macaé-class patrol vessels. The boats designated as Maracanã (P72) and Mangaratiba (P75), other two ships were commissioned in 2009 and 2010 respectively, the Macaé (P70) and Macau (P71). Between 2012 and 2013, Brazil also commissioned three Amazonas-class OPVs of 2,000 tonnes.

Icebreaker and hospital ships
In 2020, the Navy launched a project for the construction of a new research icebreaker for the Brazilian Antarctic Program, in order to replace the ship Ary Rongel (H-44), in operation since 1994, the new boat will be fully operational by 2025. The new hospital ship, named Anna Nery (U-170), is planned to be operational in 2022.

Helicopters

Since 2008, the Navy's receive annually new Eurocopter EC 725s from Helibras factory in Itajubá, Minas Gerais, as part of an initial order of 50 EC725s for the Brazilian Armed Forces, the agreement was estimated US$ 1 billion at the time. From 2018, Brazil also placed deals for the SH-60 Seahawk, eight units are in operation as of 2020. The Navy's has also a modernization program for the Westland Lynx Mk.21, with upgrade of the eight units with new CTS800 engines and avionics, the helicopter was redesignated as Super Lynx Mk.21B.

Armaments
In the beginning of the 2010s, Brazil's military strategists saw the development's necessity of an anti-ship missile and a heavyweight torpedo for the use in the future ships and submarines of the Navy from the 2020s, and to secure the technological independence in these types of armaments. In 2011, the Ministry of Defence launched both the MANSUP and TPNer programs, to the development of the very first national anti-ship missiles and heavyweight torpedoes. As of 2021, the MANSUP completed three firing tests, the TPNer is still in development. The Navy received in 2020 the first batch of the French torpedo F21 Artemis, for the Scorpene submarines, and the Mark 54 for the use in the S-70B Seahawks.

Satellites
Since 2010, through the Brazilian Space Agency, the Brazilian Armed Forces launched several satellites to orbit, like the SGDC-1 and the Amazônia-1 in order to integrate the MoD's military communications with the three branches across the country, also to conduct imagery intelligence, reconnaissance and earth observation operations. Several other are planned to the 2020s.

SisGAAz
This area is home to a huge diversity of marine species, valuable metallic minerals and other mineral resources, petroleum, and the world's second largest rare-earth reserve. The SisGAAz integrates equipment and systems composed of radars incorporated on land and vessels, as well as high resolution cameras and features such as the fusion of information received from collaborative systems.

Planned projects

Aircraft carrier
The future aircraft carrier possibly named as Rio de Janeiro is planned under the PAEMB program (initials in Portuguese to Brazilian Navy Coordination and Equipment Plan), aiming to a completely operational carrier in the 2040s. The plan was revised in the last LBDN edition and accepted by the Ministry of Defence, the National Congress and President Jair Bolsonaro in 2020. In 2018, the Former Brazilian Navy Commander Eduardo Bacellar Leal Ferreira, confirmed the plans for a national aircraft carrier of 50,000 tonnes, possibly using the original projects of the French aircraft carrier Charles de Gaulle, offered to Brazil in 2012, the doubt was the propulsion system and its costs, estimated in US$ 3.5 billion for a conventional carrier with catapults, and US$ 5.25 billion for a nuclear powered carrier, using an adapted version of the naval reactor under development for the Álvaro Alberto-class SSNs.

Air-defense destroyers
Under PROSUPER, the Navy also plans up to five 6,000-7,000 tons air-defence destroyers, to be part of the future carrier strike group. In 2019, the Admiralty began evaluating the deal for ships already operating in foreign navies, the Arleigh Burke class Flight 1 destroyer, was reported to be one of the candidates, with an estimated budget of US$ 1 billion for future negotiations. In 2020, the Thyssenkrupp Marine Systems presented to the Navy its most modern 7,200 tonnes MEKO A-400 air defense destroyer, an updated version of the German F-125-class frigates. The similarities of the F-125 class frigates with the Tamandaré-class frigate made a good impression with the Admiralty.

Maritime fighters
The Brazilian Navy plans up to 48 naval fighters for the use in the new aircraft carrier. The Navy has shown interest in a proposed naval version of the Saab JAS 39 Gripen, already in operation in the Brazilian Air Force.

Medium-range air defense system
The Ministry of Defence will start in the 2020s, the acquisition of a medium-range air defense system. In December 2020, the MoD approved the prerequisites. The system will be operated by the three branches of the Brazilian Armed Forces, in order to reduce operational costs and to facilitate the integration between all systems already in operation in the forces. The battery will have to comply with the following operational requirements: must be able to effectively engage aerospace threats simultaneously in a minimum horizontal engagement range not exceeding 2,000 meters; maximum horizontal engagement range not less than 40,000 meters; minimum vertical engagement range not exceeding 50 meters; and maximum vertical engagement range not less than 15,000 meters. The system will be capable of engaging fixed-wing aircraft, helicopters, UAVs, cruise missiles and guided bombs.

See also

Future of the Brazilian Army
Future of the Brazilian Air Force

References

Brazilian Navy
Military planning